This is a list of leaders of the opposition in the Telangana Legislative Assembly.

Leaders of the opposition

References

 
Telangana Legislative Assembly
Leader of the Opposition